Ceratrichia brunnea is a species of butterfly in the family Hesperiidae. It is found in Cameroon, the Democratic Republic of the Congo, Uganda, Kenya and Tanzania. The habitat consists of forests.

Subspecies
Ceratrichia brunnea brunnea (Democratic Republic of the Congo, Uganda, western Kenya, north-western Tanzania)
Ceratrichia brunnea ialemia Druce, 1909 (Cameroon)

References

Butterflies described in 1906
Hesperiinae